The replaceability argument, or the logic of the larder, is a philosophical argument that has been used to reject vegetarianism. It holds that consuming nonhuman animal products is good for animals because if they were not consumed, fewer animals would be brought into existence. The argument has particularly been engaged with within the context of utilitarianism.

History 

In 1789, the utilitarian philosopher Jeremy Bentham endorsed a variant of the argument, contending that painlessly killing a nonhuman animal is beneficial for everyone because it does not harm the animal and the consumers of the meat produced from the animal's body are better off as a result.

David George Ritchie used the argument, in 1895, in response to the assertions advanced for vegetarianism by Henry S. Salt in Animals' Rights (1892); Ritchie stated: "If all the world were Jews, it has been well said, there would be no pigs in existence; and if all the world were vegetarians, would there be any sheep or cattle, well cared for, and guarded against starvation?". Leslie Stephen, in 1896, described the "argument for humanity" as the weakest argument for vegetarianism and echoed Ritchie's argument, stating: "The pig has a stronger interest than anyone in the demand for bacon".

In 1896, Salt responded to both authors, labelling their argument as fallacious because it is based on a reference to "another existence" when it actually concerns "this existence". He then asserted that it cannot be demonstrated that it is an "advantage to the Pig to be born". In 1914, Salt published The Humanities of Diet, again engaging with the argument, which he termed the "logic of the larder". He described it as "the very negation of a true reverence for life; for it implies that the real lover of animals is he whose larder is fullest of them" and stated that:It is often said, as an excuse for the slaughter of animals, that it is better for them to live and to be butchered than not to live at all. Now, obviously, if such reasoning justifies the practice of flesh-eating, it must equally justify all breeding of animals for profit or pastime, when their life is a fairly happy one. ... In fact ... there is hardly any treatment that cannot be justified by the supposed terms of such a contract. Also, the argument must apply to mankind. ... The fallacy lies in the confusion of thought which attempts to compare existence with non-existence. A person who is already in existence may feel that he would rather have lived than not, but he must first have the terra firma of existence to argue from; the moment he begins to argue as if from the abyss of the non-existent, he talks nonsense, by predicating good or evil, happiness or unhappiness, of that of which we can predicate nothing.In Animal Liberation, published in 1975, the utilitarian philosopher Peter Singer agreed with Salt's view. However, he changed his view while writing Practical Ethics, after being influenced by Derek Parfit's engagement with "impersonal wrongs" and the nonidentity problem.

Tatjana Višak engages with the argument, within the context of utilitarianism, in her 2013 book Killing Happy Animals. She ultimately rejects the argument, asserting that being brought into existence is not beneficial for these beings.

See also 
 Antinatalism
 Ethics of eating meat
In humans:
The deprivation argument, that being born is inherently advantageous to unborn children
The nonidentity problem (closely related)
Every Sperm Is Sacred, a satire about taking the deprivation argument to its extreme of using no contraception

References

Further reading 
 
 

Animal ethics
Philosophical arguments
Utilitarianism
Vegetarianism